Spilogona falleni is a species of fly which is distributed across many parts of the Palaearctic.

References

Muscidae
Diptera of Europe
Insects described in 1984